A by-election was held for the New South Wales Legislative Assembly electorate of The Hunter on 5 August 1861 because Isidore Blake resigned to accept appointment as a judge of the District Court.

Dates

Polling places

Result

Isidore Blake resigned.

See also
Electoral results for the district of Hunter
List of New South Wales state by-elections

References

1861 elections in Australia
New South Wales state by-elections
1860s in New South Wales